Generation Next may refer to:

 Generation Next (professional wrestling), a professional wrestling stable
 Generation Next (album), the debut album from Aventura
 Generation Next (comics), a Marvel Comics team and eponymous series
 Generation neXt, one of the names for Yu-Gi-Oh! GX (it is the GX of the final title)
 Generation Y, also known as the Millennial Generation or Generation Next or Net Generation
 GeneratioNext, Pepsi ad campaign, variant of Pepsi Generation
 "Move Over", also known as "Generation Next", a promotional single by the Spice Girls for the Pepsi ad campaign

See also
Next Generation (disambiguation)